Catapausa albaria is a species of beetle in the family Cerambycidae. It was described by Heller in 1926. It is known from Papua New Guinea.

References

Homonoeini
Beetles described in 1926